Stylophorum (celandine-poppy) is a genus of three species of herbaceous perennial plants native to woodland in eastern North America and China.

Stems are bristly, and leaves are lobed and have wavy edges.

Flowers are yellow and have four petals and an unusually long style, for which the genus is named. Several may be found on each stem.

The closely related Hylomecon vernalis has only one flower on each stem, and the greater celandine (Chelidonium majus) has branched stems and no bracts or bracteoles.

Species
There are three species:

References

 Christopher Grey-Wilson, Poppies (Portland: Timber Press, 2000)  pp. 42–44

External links

Papaveroideae
Papaveraceae genera